Nils Wallerius (1 January 1706 –  16 August 1764) was a Swedish physicist, philosopher and theologian. He was one of the first scientists to study and document the characteristics of evaporation through modern scientific methods. He was also among the first and more notable followers of the philosophies of German philosopher Christian Wolff (1679–1754).

Biography
Nils Wallerius was born at Stora Mellösa in Örebro County, Sweden. He was the son of provost Erik Nilsson Wallerius of Stora Mellösa and his spouse Elisabeth Tranæa. He was a brother of chemist and mineralogist Johan Gottschalk Wallerius (1709–1785). He studied philosophy and physics at the University of Uppsala, where in 1746 he became professor of logic and metaphysics. In 1755, he received a professorship in theology, a post established by Bishop Andreas Kalsenius (1688-1750). His  studies in physics, especially in the field of evaporation, earned him praise and a place as the 26th member of the Royal Swedish Academy of Sciences in 1739. Wallerius's research was mostly focused on if and how evaporation occurs in open or vacuumed environments. His experiments with evaporation in different environments ranged from observing the weight loss of an egg over an entire year or how long a cup of wine from the Rhine region evaporated, to large scale sealed copper tanks filled with various fluids observed over time. His results confirming that evaporation occurs in sealed environments still stand today and are important factors in various areas, but mainly industry.

Wallerius was also a religious man who, while influenced by the enlightened time he was living in, viewed many of his younger colleagues' liberal beliefs as a threat to religion. After a conflict with his senior mentor Samuel Klingenstierna (1698-1765), he left the physic faculty and instead became a professor in theology. During the 1750s he made a name for himself in the theological debate as a known devoted defender of his Wolffian beliefs. He spoke at least 5 languages fluently (Swedish, Latin, English, German, French) and had special permission to buy foreign literature deemed blasphemous by the Swedish church in order to study it. Wallerius actively participated in over 200 disputations both of his own works and by others where he often rhetorically attacked those who showed a too much enlightened view on science and theology. When Emanuel Swedenborg was asked after the death of Nils Wallerius in 1764 what he thought the professor was doing in heaven he replied "He still goes about and holds disputations".

Wallerius was also an avid and popular lecturer who during periods of his career spent 8–10 hours per day lecturing for a huge number of students. His lectures became so popular that he sometimes placed them at 2 AM to hold the number of listeners at acceptable levels. During his life he published many works in his various fields of studies. Among them is his 750-page handbook to physics Elementa physices and his 870-page study of the soul through the philosophies of Christian Wolff in Psychologia Empirica, ea continens quæ de Anima humana Indubia Experientiæ fide cognoscuntur, Methodo Scientifica Pertractata (1755).

References

Other Sources
 
 Frangsmyr, Tore, J. L. Heilbron, and Robin E. Rider, editors  (1990) The Quantifying Spirit in the 18th Century (Berkeley:University of California Press) 
Anna Backman, Anna 1700-talets hästvardag – praktiker och attityder speglade i två akademistallmästares manuskript  (Lychnos. 1967–68)

Members of the Royal Swedish Academy of Sciences
1706 births
1764 deaths
People from Örebro County
Uppsala University alumni
Academic staff of Uppsala University
18th-century Swedish people
Swedish philosophers
Swedish theologians
18th-century Protestant theologians
18th-century Swedish scientists